The following lists events that happened during 1911 in New Zealand.

Incumbents

Regal and viceregal
Head of State – George V
Governor – The Lord Islington GCMG GBE DSO PC

Government
Speaker of the House – Arthur Guinness (Liberal)
Prime Minister – Joseph Ward (Liberal)
Minister of Finance – Joseph Ward
Chief Justice – Sir Robert Stout

Parliamentary opposition
Leader of the Opposition – William Massey (Reform Party).

Main centre leaders
Mayor of Auckland – Lemuel Bagnall, then James Parr
Mayor of Wellington – Thomas Wilford
Mayor of Christchurch – Charles Allison, then Tommy Taylor, then John Joseph Dougall
Mayor of Dunedin – Thomas Cole, then William Burnett

Events 
The Marlborough Herald ceases publication. It began in 1905.
 30 January: The final race meeting at which bookmakers are allowed on New Zealand racecourses.
 5 February: The first officially recorded powered aeroplane flight in new Zealand. The Walsh Brothers' Howard Wright biplane Manurewa makes its first flight at Glenora Park, Papakura near Auckland. The plane is capable of carrying a passenger and almost certainly did so before the end of the year.
1 June: Women could no longer be employed as barmaids (with exemptions for existing barmaids and for relations of publicans). 
23 December: George Bolt's first flights, in an early form of hang-glider.

Undated
Arthur Schaef makes short powered hops in his first aircraft, the New Zealand Vogel, at Lyall Bay, Wellington.

Arts and literature

See 1911 in art, 1911 in literature

Music

See: 1911 in music

Film

See: :Category:1911 film awards, 1911 in film, List of New Zealand feature films, Cinema of New Zealand, :Category:1911 films

Sport

 See: 1911 in sports, :Category:1911 in sports

Athletics
Three New Zealanders, Guy Haskins, Ron Opie and William A. Woodger, compete in the Festival of Empire meeting in London, a forerunner of the Empire (now Commonwealth) Games.

Chess
 The 24th National Chess Championship was held in Timaru, and was won by W.E. Mason of Wellington, his third title.

Golf

Men's
 The fifth New Zealand Open championship was held in Wanganui and was won by amateur Arthur Duncan, his third win.
 The 19th National Amateur Championships were held in Wanganui
 Men: Arthur Duncan (Wellington) – 7th title

Women's
 Matchplay:  Miss ? Brandon.
 Strokeplay (1st championship): Mrs G. Williams

Horse racing

Harness racing
 New Zealand Trotting Cup: Lady Clare
 Auckland Trotting Cup: Bingana

Rugby league
New Zealand national rugby league team

Rugby union
 Auckland defend the Ranfurly Shield against South Auckland (21–5) and Poverty Bay (29–10)

Soccer
A provincial league commences in Wanganui
Provincial league champions:
	Auckland:	Ponsonby AFC (Auckland)
	Canterbury:	Burnham Industrial School
	Otago:	Mornington
	Southland:	Nightcaps
	Taranaki:	Manaia
	Wanganui:	Wanganui
	Wellington:	Wellington Swifts

Tennis
 The Davis Cup final is held at Hagley Park, Christchurch. The Australasian team of Norman Brookes (Aus), Roger Heath (Aus) and Alfred Dunlop (NZ, doubles) beat the United States 4–0, the second reverse singles match not being played.
Anthony Wilding wins the men's singles at the Wimbledon Championship for the second year in succession.

Births
 13 January: Joh Bjelke-Petersen, Premier of Queensland (Australia).
 24 January: Alfred Hulme, Victoria Cross winner.
 17 February: Saul Goldsmith, political candidate.  
 28 February: J. A. W. Bennett, literary scholar.
 30 March: David Russell, George Cross winner.
 2 May: Ina Pickering, cricketer.
 17 June: Allen Curnow, poet and journalist.
 29 September: Harry Lake, politician.
 12 December (in England): Joe Bootham, painter.

Deaths
 6 March: Mary Anne Barker (Lady Barker), author.
 2 May: Edward Riddiford, runholder
 4 May: Rose Whitty, nun and founder of several convents.
 27 July: Tommy Taylor, politician, prohibitionist.
 14 December: Henry Hirst, politician (born 1838).
 Date unknown:
 Charles Wong Gye, storekeeper, policeman and interpreter
 Puna Himene Te Rangimarie,  healer, nurse and spiritual leader
:Category:1911 deaths

See also
List of years in New Zealand
Timeline of New Zealand history
History of New Zealand
Military history of New Zealand
Timeline of the New Zealand environment
Timeline of New Zealand's links with Antarctica

References

External links